Chimaeridris is a small genus of ants in the subfamily Myrmicinae. The genus contains two species known from tropical Asia. Their unique hook-shaped mandibles and similar appearance to Pheidole minor workers raises the possibility that the genus is a slave-maker of Pheidole ants or a specialized predator.

Species
 Chimaeridris boltoni Wilson, 1989 – Sulawesi
 Chimaeridris burckhardti Wilson, 1989 – Sabah

References

External links

Myrmicinae
Ant genera
Hymenoptera of Asia